Sünt-Hasardag Sanctuary is a sanctuary (zakaznik) of Turkmenistan.

It is part of Sünt-Hasardag Nature Reserve. It was separated from the Central site of the reserve with a view of improving the social and economic conditions of the population of Magtymguly District.

External links
 https://web.archive.org/web/20090609072344/http://natureprotection.gov.tm/reserve_tm.html

Sanctuaries in Turkmenistan